Saint-Cirq may refer to the following places in France:

 Saint-Cirq, Dordogne, a commune in the Dordogne department
 Saint-Cirq, Tarn-et-Garonne, a commune in the Tarn-et-Garonne department